Brigitte is a feminine given name.

Brigitte may also refer to:

Brigitte (dog), a French Bulldog dog actress
Brigitte (duo), a French musical duo consisting of Aurélie "Maggiori" Saada and Sylvie Hoarau
Brigitte (magazine), a German magazine for women
Brigitte (Overwatch), a fictional character in the video game Overwatch
Sainte-Brigitte, a commune of Morbihan, Brittany, France
Willie Brigitte (born 1968), French terrorist
Maman Brigitte, one of the loa

See also
Brigitte et Brigitte, a 1966 French film
Bridget (disambiguation)